Armagomphus is a monotypic genus of dragonflies in the family Gomphidae, 
endemic to south-western Australia.
The single known species is small in size with black and yellow markings.

Species
The genus contains only one species:

Armagomphus armiger  - Armourtail

See also
 List of Odonata species of Australia

References

Gomphidae
Anisoptera genera
Monotypic Odonata genera
Odonata of Australia
Endemic fauna of Australia
Taxa named by Frank Louis Carle
Insects described in 1986